Potential evaporation (PE) or potential evapotranspiration (PET) is defined as the amount of evaporation that would occur if a sufficient water source were available.  If the actual evapotranspiration is considered the net result of atmospheric demand for moisture from a surface and the ability of the surface to supply moisture, then PET is a measure of the demand side.  Surface and air temperatures, insolation, and wind all affect this.  A dryland is a place where annual potential evaporation exceeds annual precipitation.

Estimates of potential evaporation

Thornthwaite equation (1948) 

Where

 is the estimated potential evapotranspiration (mm/month)

 is the average daily temperature (degrees Celsius; if this is negative, use ) of the month being calculated

 is the number of days in the month being calculated

 is the average day length (hours) of the month being calculated

 is a heat index which depends on the 12 monthly mean temperatures .

Somewhat modified forms of this equation appear in later publications (1955 and 1957) by Thornthwaite and Mather.

Penman equation (1948) 
The Penman equation describes evaporation (E) from an open water surface, and was developed by Howard Penman in 1948. Penman's equation requires daily mean temperature, wind speed, air pressure, and solar radiation to predict E. Simpler Hydrometeorological equations continue to be used where obtaining such data is impractical, to give comparable results within specific contexts, e.g. humid vs arid climates.

FAO 56 Penman–Monteith equation (1998) 
The Penman–Monteith equation refines weather based evapotranspiration (ET) estimates of vegetated land areas. This equation was then derived by FAO for retrieving the potential evapotranspiration 0.  It is widely regarded as one of the most accurate models, in terms of estimates.

ET0 = Potential evapotranspiration, Water volume evapotranspired (mm day−1)
Δ = Rate of change of saturation specific humidity with air temperature. (Pa K−1)
Rn = Net irradiance (MJ m−2 day−1), the external source of energy flux
G = Ground heat flux (MJ m−2 day−1), usually equivalent to zero on a day
T = Air temperature at 2m (K)
u_2 = Wind speed at 2m height (m−1)
δe = vapor pressure deficit (kPa)
γ = Psychrometric constant (γ ≈ 66 Pa K−1)

N.B.: The coefficient 0.408 and 900 are not unitless but account for the conversion from energy values to equivalent water depths: radiation [mm day−1] = 0.408 radiation [MJ m−2 day−1].

Priestley–Taylor
The Priestley–Taylor equation was developed as a substitute to the Penman–Monteith equation to remove dependence on observations. For Priestley–Taylor, only radiation (irradiance) observations are required. This is done by removing the aerodynamic terms from the Penman–Monteith equation and adding an empirically derived constant factor, .

The underlying concept behind the Priestley–Taylor model is that an air mass moving above a vegetated area with abundant water would become saturated with water. In these conditions, the actual evapotranspiration would match the Penman rate of potential evapotranspiration. The assumption here is for vegetation with an abundant water supply (i.e. the plants have low moisture stress). Areas like arid regions with high moisture stress are estimated to have higher  values.

The assumption that an air mass moving over a vegetated surface with abundant water saturates has been questioned later. The lowest and turbulent part of the atmosphere, the atmospheric boundary layer, is not a closed box, but constantly brings in dry air from higher up in the atmosphere towards the surface. As water evaporates more easily into a dry atmosphere, evapotranspiration is enhanced. This explains the larger than unity value of the Priestley-Taylor parameter . The proper equilibrium of the system has been derived and involves the characteristics of the interface of the atmospheric boundary layer and the overlying free atmosphere.

See also 
 Evaporation
 Water vapor
 Water cycle
 Köppen climate classification

References

External links
 ag.arizona.edu Global map of potential evaporation.

Climatology
Meteorological phenomena
Articles containing video clips